Pellenes tharinae is a jumping spider species in the genus Pellenes that lives in Namibia, South Africa and Zimbabwe. It was first described by Wanda Wesołowska in 2006. Pellenes pulcher was declared a homonym for the species in 2009.

References

Salticidae
Arthropods of Namibia
Spiders of South Africa
Arthropods of Zimbabwe
Spiders of Africa
Spiders described in 2006
Taxa named by Wanda Wesołowska